Yermolinskaya is a rural locality (a village) in Bogorodskoye Rural Settlement, Ust-Kubinsky  District, Vologda Oblast, Russia. The population was 8 as of 2002.

Geography 
Yermolinskaya is located 52 km northwest of Ustye (the district's administrative centre) by road. Bogorodskoye is the nearest rural locality.

References 

Rural localities in Tarnogsky District